Juliet Menéndez is a Guatemalan American author.

She was a public school art teacher in New York City. She studied at LISAA School of Art & Design.

Works 

 Latinitas: Celebrating 40 Big Dreamers, Henry Holt and Co. 2021.  
 Skyscraper Babies, Laura Godwin Books,

References

External links 

 http://www.julietmenendez.com/

21st-century Guatemalan women writers
Guatemalan women illustrators
Year of birth missing (living people)
Living people
Place of birth missing (living people)